The Leyland Royal Tiger was a rear-engined coach chassis manufactured by Leyland between 1982 and 1987. It was intended to counter the offerings of foreign competitors such as the Jonckheere or Van Hool bodied DAF, Scania and Volvo touring coaches, but was not particularly successful, with only between 160 and 170 built.

The majority (around 60%) were built as integral vehicles by Leyland themselves, in which case they were named Leyland Royal Tiger Doyen. Earlier examples were built at Leyland's Charles H Roe subsidiary in Leeds. Production later moved to Workington. The remainder of the underframes were given Plaxton Paramount or Van Hool bodywork.

The Royal Tiger was fitted with Leyland's TL11 engine or in some cases the Cummins L10. Following the takeover of Leyland by Volvo, the Royal Tiger ceased production in 1987.

National Travel East operated the largest number of Royal Tigers with eleven  whilst their successor, Ridings Travel, operated the largest number of Doyens, taking eight in 1988. Only a few Royal Tigers have survived, including E50TYG at the Dewsbury Bus Museum.

References

Millar, Alan (1992) Bus & Coach Recognition Ian Allan Publishing

External links

Royal Tiger
Vehicles introduced in 1982
Bus chassis